The Everton Formation is a geologic formation in northern Arkansas that dates to the middle Ordovician Period. Unconformities separate this formation from the underlying Powell Formation and the overlying St. Peter Sandstone Formation. Named for the town of Everton in Boone County, Arkansas in 1907, the Everton Formation is composed primarily of dolomite, limestone, and sandstone.

Stratigraphy
Five named members of the Everton Formation are recognized (in stratigraphic order):
Jasper Limestone Member
Newton Sandstone Member
Calico Rock Sandstone Member
Kings River Sandstone Member
Sneeds Limestone Lentil

See also

 List of fossiliferous stratigraphic units in Arkansas
 Paleontology in Arkansas

References

 

Ordovician Arkansas
Ordovician southern paleotemperate deposits